Hillsborough Resources Limited was a privately-held coal mining company headquartered in Vancouver, British Columbia, Canada.

Hillsborough operated the Quinsam underground thermal coal mine near Campbell River, British Columbia from 1987, serving the local and west-coast United States cement industry, and the Crossville underground coal mine in Tennessee, United States serving the regional power utility and industrial markets. It also developed the Wapiti Thermal Coal mine near Tumbler Ridge. In addition, Hillsborough owned and operated the Middle Point Barge Loading Facility located on Vancouver Island, Canada.

The company's Crossville mine had discontinued operation by 2007, and the company closed the Quinsam mine in 2016 due to economic pressure, firing 66 people in the process.

It emerged out of bankruptcy protection in 2000 to fend off a takeover bid offering in 2000 $0.18 per share, by Vulcan Capital Management. However, effective December 21, 2009, Vitol Anker International B.V. of the Vitol Group acquired Hillsborough Resources Limited for $0.50 per share, inheriting all its debt.

References 

Companies formerly listed on the Toronto Stock Exchange
Mining companies of Canada